German Swiss usually refers to either a single, a group of, or all Swiss citizens with origins from the German-speaking Switzerland.

German Swiss may also refer to:

German Swiss International School (Hong Kong)
German Swiss International School (Ghana)
German-Swiss border
Germany–Switzerland relations
Swiss-German Sign Language

See also
 Swiss-German (disambiguation)

Language and nationality disambiguation pages